"Girl's Life" is a song recorded by Australian group Girlfriend. The song was released in July 1992 as the group's second single from their debut studio album Make It Come True. The song peaked at number 15 on the ARIA Charts.

The song used the Spice Girls' eventual catchphrase "girl power". In 2017, band member Robyn Loau said “I remember in the early '90s we met with a big pop manager in the United Kingdom who went off to put together the Spice Girls. I'm not sure how much of meeting us was his blueprint for the Spice Girls. It was interesting they all had a very certain role, which Girlfriend had also. I feel as though we were pioneers, even if we were unaware of it at the time.”

Track listing

Charts

Weekly charts

Year-end charts

References

1992 songs
1992 singles
Dance-pop songs
Bertelsmann Music Group singles
Arista Records singles
Girlfriend (band) songs
Songs written by Pam Reswick
Songs written by Steve Werfel